Jan Budař (born 31 July 1977) is a Czech actor, director, singer, composer and script writer.

Biography
Budař was born in Frýdlant near Liberec. He graduated from the Janáček Academy of Music and Performing Arts (JAMU) in Brno in 2000. He started his career in Brno's theatres under the tutelage of theatre director Vladimír Morávek. This creative partnership led to their first film, Boredom in Brno. Budař also co-authored the script and composed the music. The comedy was awarded five Czech Lions in 2003, including Best Male Actor for Jan Budař's performance. Budař went on to roles in Marek Najbrt's debut Champions and Jan Hřebejk's Up and down, the Czech entry for the Academy Awards, which won several awards at the Czech Lion Awards 2005. Morávek and Budař created their second film, Hrubeš and Mareš best friends: come rain or shine. 

Budař also sings with a band called the Eliščin Band, and makes short films, documentaries and videos. In March 2005, Budař won the Czech Lion award for "Best Supporting Actor" in Champions. In February 2005, Budař went to Berlin to represent Czech cinematography at the Berlinale 2005 Film Festival.

Selected filmography

1997: Četnické humoresky (TV series)
1998: Stůj, nebo se netrefím! – Soldier
1998: Winter '89 – Thomas
1999: Urlaub auf Leben und Tod – Eine Familie hält zusammen (TV series)
2000:  (TV series)
2000: Český Robinson (TV Series)
2001: Otec neznámý aneb Cesta do hlubin duše výstrojního náčelníka (TV movie) – Soldier
2001: Muž, který vycházel z hrobu (TV movie)
2002: Ta třetí (TV Movie) – Emil
2003: Čert ví proč – Man-at-arms No. 1
2003: Boredom in Brno – Stanislav Pichlík
2004: Mistři (Champions) – Bohouš
2004: Horem pádem (Up and down) – Milan
2004: Duše jako kaviár (Dirty soul) – Vladimír
2005: Voníš jako tenkrát – Adam
2005: Hrubeš a Mareš jsou kamarádi do deště – Václav Hrubeš
2005: Toyen – Jindřich Hejzlar
2005: Svatyně (Short)
2005: Ráno Ruth to vidí jinak (TV movie) – Adam
2005: Stavrogin je ďábel (theatre)
2006: Marta a Berta 26 (Short)
2006: Pravidla lži (Rules of lies) – Filip
2007: Vratné lahve (Empties) – Úlisný
2007: Hodina klavíru (TV Movie) – Ing. Erhadt
2007: Václav – František
2007: Trapasy (TV Series)
2008: Svatba na bitevním poli – Jumper
2008: Muzika (Slovakia, Germany) – Hruškovič
2008: Soukromé pasti (TV Series) – Tonda / Viktor Hojdar
2008: Nebe a Vincek (TV Movie) – Žáček
2008: Dark Spirits Natěrač (USA) – David
2008: Bez dechu (Short) (student film)
2008: Bratři Karamazovi: Vzkříšení (theatre)
2009: Holka Ferrari Dino
2009: Operace Dunaj (Operation Dunaj) (Czech Republic, Poland) – Ota
2009: Love Life of a Gentle Coward (Ljubavni život domobrana) (Croatia) – Honza
2009: La mujer sin piano – Rdek
2009: Protector (Czech Republic, Germany) – Colleague
2009: Žena bez piana (Mujer sin piano) (Spain)
2010: Dešťová víla – Vladimír
2010: Pravidelný odlet
2010: Román pro muže – René
2010: Heart Beat 3D
2010: Osudové peníze (TV Movie)
2010–2013: Vyprávěj (TV Series) – Milan Kohoutek
2011: Odcházení – Albín
2011: Czech Made Man – Jakub Vrána
2011: Lidice (Czech Republic, Poland) – Safebreaker Petiška
2011: Rodina je základ státu
2011: Setkání s hvězdou: Vilma Cibulková (TV movie)
2011: Vesnice roku (student film)
2011: Vetřelci a lovci: Užij si se psem (TV movie)
2012: eŠTeBák (Konfident) (Slovakia, Czech Republic, Poland) – Commander Rybarik
2012: Polski film (Czech Republic, Poland) – Jan Budař
2012: Praho, má lásko (students' film) – (segment "Právnička")
2012: O pokladech (TV Movie) – Treasure Guardian No. 2
2012: Výstava (Slovakia)
2012: Akvabely
2012: Duše na talíři
2013: Hořící keř (TV Mini-Series, directed by Agnieszka Holland) – Radim Bures
2013: Martin a Venuše – Ales
2013: Mieletön elokuu – Andrusenko
2013: České století (TV Series) – Václav Kopecký
2013: Sanitka II (TV Series) – Gordon Mádr
2013: Rozkoš
2013: Něžné vlny – postman Dusan Beznoska
2016:  – Grandson
2016: Anthropoid – Josef Chalupský
2016: Instalatér z Tuchlovic – Radek
2016: Tenkrát v ráji
2017: Všechno nebo nic – Milan
2017: Svět pod hlavou (TV Series) – Klement Kratena
2017: Lajka – (voice)
2017: Princ Mamánek (fairy tale)
2018: Insects – Václav / Lumek / Jan Budar
2018: Hovory s TGM – Karel Čapek
2018: Čertí brko – Mr. Slime
2022: Medieval – Matthew

Documentary films
2006: Přestávka
2007: Film o filmu: Václav (TV film)
2008: Peníze Jiřího Krejčíka
2008: Film o filmu: Protektor (TV film)
2008: Anatomie gagu
2011: Film o filmu: Czech Made Man

Film direction
He directed several short films and videoclips mostly for his new album.
2004: Ráno
2006: Strážce plamene v obrazech (Video film)
2012: Polski film

Television programs
2000: Krásný ztráty2004: Uvolněte se, prosím2004: Na stojáka2005: Všechnopárty2007: Dobročinná akademie aneb Paraple 20072007: Český lev2008: Český lev 20072009: Fakta Barbory Tachecí2010: Rozmarná léta českého filmu2010: E.ON Energy Globe Award ČR2011: Český lev 2010Awards
2003: Trilobit Award by FITES (Film and Television Association), Prague, Czech Republic
2003: Boredom in Brno – Best Male Actor
2003: Boredom in Brno – Best script (co-authored with Vladimír Morávek)
2004: The Alfréd Radok Award (Ceny Alfréda Radoka) Best Actor for Mr. Stavrogin in The Devils (The Alfréd Radok Award in collaboration with the Aura–Pont agency and the magazine Svět a Divadlo (The World and Theatre) for achievements in Czech theatre
2004: Mistři (Champions) – Czech Lion – Best Supporting Actor
2005: Studio Hamburg Shooting Stars Award
2007: Václav –  Czech Lion – Best Supporting Actor
 2011: Novoměstský hrnec smíchu Festival (Nové Město nad Metují) – Best Male Actor – Czech Made ManDiscography
Budař has composed over 50 songs in Czech, English and Spanish. He has also composed music for the films Boredom in Brno and Hrubeš and Mareš and for over 20 theatre performances.
With his band Eliščin Band, Budař released four albums.

CDs
 Písně pro Hrubeše a Mareše, 2005
 Uletěl orlovi, 2006
 Proměna, 2008
 Lehce probuzený, 2012

DVDs
 Uletěl orlovi, 2006

Film music
 , 2000
 Boredom in Brno, 2003
 Hrubeš a Mareš jsou kamarádi do deště, 2005
 Nebe a Vincek'' [TV film], 2008
 Hrubeš a Mareš Reloaded, 2009	
 Protector, 2009
 Lidice, 2011

Books
2013 The fairy tales 'Největší Tajemství Leoplda Bumbáce'. The book is published with a fairy tale of Antonín Dočekal in Mladá fronta .
2017 Princ Mamánek

References

External links
 Official website 
 

Czech male film actors
Czech male stage actors
Czech male television actors
21st-century Czech male singers
Living people
1977 births
People from Frýdlant
Janáček Academy of Music and Performing Arts alumni
21st-century Czech male actors
Czech Lion Awards winners